Govindasamy Viswanathan, is the founder and chancellor of Vellore Institute of Technology in India, was born on 8 December 1938 in a remote village in the south Indian state of Tamil Nadu.He served as a Member of Parliament and as a Member of the Legislative Assembly of Tamil Nadu. He was elected to the Tamil Nadu legislative assembly as an Anna Dravida Munnetra Kazhagam candidate from Anaicut constituency in the 1980 election and from Arcot constituency in 1991 election.

Early life and education 

Viswanathan was born in a family near Gudiyattam. He attended the six-week Advanced Management Program at the Harvard Business School in 2003. He obtained a Master's Degree in Economics from Loyola College and completed Law from Madras University. His leadership skills were noticed by C. N. Annadurai and the DMK party chose him to contest the elections in 1967. He entered the Indian parliament representing the aspirations of around 500,000 people of his constituency.

Career 

Currently, Dr. G Viswanathan holds these offices:
 Chancellor, VIT University, Vellore
 Chancellor, VIT University, Chennai
 Chancellor, VIT-AP University, Amaravati
 Chancellor, VIT Bhopal University, Bhopal
 Chairman and Managing Trustee, North Arcot Educational and Charitable Trust, Vellore
 President, Friends of United States
 Executive President, The Centenarian Trust, Chennai
 Vice President, Thiru Vi Ka — Dr. Mu. Va. Educational Trust, Chennai
 President, Universal Higher Education Trust, Vellore (NGO)
 President, Indian Economic Association (IEA)
 President, Education Promotion Society of India (EPSI) [https://epsiindia.org/]
 President, North Arcot District Tuluva Vellala Association.

References

1938 births
Living people
People from Tamil Nadu
Tamil Nadu academics
Tamil Nadu politicians
India MPs 1967–1970
India MPs 1971–1977
Lok Sabha members from Tamil Nadu
People from Tiruvannamalai district
Loyola College, Chennai alumni
Vellore Institute of Technology
Tamil Nadu MLAs 1991–1996